18 Wheeler were a Scottish rock band active in the
1990s, consisting of Sean Jackson (vocals, guitar), David Keenan (guitar, vocals), Alan Hake (bass), and Neil Halliday (drums). Original bassist Chris "Pint Glass" Stewart left before any recordings were made, and was replaced by original drummer Hake.

Keenan left in 1994 to start his own group, the Telstar Ponies and was replaced by guitarist Steven Haddow. In the same year, the band released their first album Twin Action on Creation Records on 25 July, and on 22 May 1995 they released their second album, Formanka.

Their third album, Year Zero, which saw them take a more experimental sample-based approach, was released on 10 March 1997. The remixed single "Stay" was given mainstream radio play and gave them their only UK Top 75 hit single (peaking at No. 59 in March). They were subsequently dropped by Creation during the recording of what was to be their fourth studio release. Although Alan Hake has stated that Creation Records allowed the band to keep the master tapes to this album, no plans to officially release it have materialised. Hake went on to co-found the Must Destroy record label.

The band were once introduced by Tony Blair at the 1996 Labour Party Conference. The future Prime Minister managed to wrongly introduce them as "Wheeler 18". Their biggest claim to fame, however, is that they were the band Oasis were supporting the night that Oasis were discovered by Creation Records boss Alan McGee at King Tut's Wah Wah Hut in Glasgow on 31 May 1993.

After a hiatus of several years spent mainly in Central and Eastern Europe, Sean Jackson returned to the music world with the solo album Slots, recorded in 2005. The album, although written in Košice, Eastern Slovakia, and Saint Petersburg, Russian Federation, is influenced by traditional British folk, as well as rock music, and was released on PoppyDisc Records in spring 2010. He read English as undergraduate at the University of Glasgow and subsequently obtained a post-graduate diploma in Russian language from the University of Strathclyde.

Line up
 Sean Jackson: Guitars, Vocals, Bass and Piano
 Neil Halliday: Percussion, Vocals, Guitars and Synth
 Alan Hake: Bass, Vocals, Guitars and Moog
 Steven Haddow: Guitars, Vocals
 David Keenan: Guitars, Vocals
 Paul Fyfe: Guitars
 Chris Stewart: Bass

Discography

Studio albums
 Twin Action (1994, CRECD164)
 Formanka (1995, CRECD181 & CRECD181L)
 Year Zero (1997, CRECD192)

Singles and EPs
 "Nature Girl"
 "Suncrush"
 "Kum Back"
 "The Revealer"
 "Boddha"
 "Steel Guitars"
 "The Hours And The Times"
 "Crabs"
 "Prozac Beats"
 "Stay"
 "Grease"

References

External links
 Creation Records
 Ready-Steady-Go
 My Space 18 Wheeler
 My Space Sean Jackson
 My Space Astro Naughty (Steve Haddow)
 Pop Junkie: Great Lost Albums - Year Zero

Creation Records artists
Scottish rock music groups